Filiberto Fernández (born 21 April 1972) is a Mexican former wrestler who competed in the 1996 Summer Olympics.

References

External links
 

1972 births
Living people
Olympic wrestlers of Mexico
Wrestlers at the 1996 Summer Olympics
Mexican male sport wrestlers